Srah Reang is a khum (commune) of Mongkol Borei District in Banteay Meanchey Province in western Cambodia.

History
Nine houses in three villages in the commune were damaged by Typhoon Fate on the night of July 29, 2012, though the district police chief confirmed that the typhoon caused no loss of life.
In 2016, an 11-kilometer road spanning the communes of Srah Reang and Banteay Neang was damaged by heavy rain. The road was reopened in September 2016.

Geography

Villages

 Ta In Muoy
 Ta In Pir
 Krouch
 Chamkar Chek
 Srah Reang
 Ta Chan
 Kouk Srok
 Kouk Chrab
 Kouk Krasang

Landmarks
The commune contains a small health centre, the Wat Sal Rangsiyaram monastery (វត្តសាលរង្សិយារាម), and the Dongroun Pagoda.

References

Communes of Banteay Meanchey province
Mongkol Borey District